This is a list of sock manufacturers.

 Belvedere Hosiery
 Blacksocks
 Bombas
 Bonds
 Corgi Socks
 Darn Tough Vermont
 Fox River Mills
 Gold Toe Brands
 Hanesbrands
 Happy Socks
 Holeproof Hosiery
 Humphrey Law
 Jockey International
 Lafitte
 Mennie Brand
 Mitch Dowd
 Odd Sox
 Paire
 PEDS Legwear
 Pussyfoot Socks
 QT Inc.
 Renfro Brands
 Rock 'Em Socks
 RoToTo
 Sidoste
 SmartWool
 Sock Shop
 Stance
 Swiss Barefoot Company
 Tabio
 The Railroad Sock
 Wigwam Mills

See also

 List of fashion designers
 List of lingerie brands
 List of swimwear brands
 List of underwear brands

References

Sock manufacturers
Sock manufacturers
Sock manufacturers
Sock manufacturers